La Salamandre may refer to:
 La Salamandre (Alain Tanner), 1971 Swiss drama film
 La Salamandre (magazine), Swiss magazine about nature
 Prix de la Salamandre, former 1400m horse race for two-year-olds

See also 
 Le salamandre, 1969 Italian film
 Salamander (disambiguation)